Te Onetapu, commonly known as the Rangipo Desert, is a barren desert-like environment in New Zealand, located in the Ruapehu District on the North Island Volcanic Plateau; to the east of the three active peaks of Mount Tongariro, Mount Ngauruhoe, and Mount Ruapehu, and to the west of the Kaimanawa Range.

The Rangipo Desert receives  of rainfall per year, but resembles a desert because of its location on the volcanic plateau adjacently east of Ruapehu, a poor soil quality and drying winds, and also due to the mass sterilisation of seeds during a series of violent eruptions, particularly ignimbrite flows about 20,000 years ago. The vegetation is low and sparse, consisting of mainly tussock and snow grasses. The headwaters of many small streams, which later turn into large rivers, gouge deep serrated valleys through the unconsolidated ash and pumice-rich earth. The climate here is harsh and alpine, with close to 270 ground frosts per year in comparison with less than 30 in the coastal regions of Hawke's Bay,  to the east. Heavy snowfalls - rarely seen in the rest of the island - are also a common occurrence in winter. Trampers and climbers in the area should be mindful of the extreme chill effect of the cold south wind which can produce wind chill factors lowering the temperature below 0°C (32°F) for days on end.

The region is largely uninhabited, possibly due to the unproductive nature of the extreme winter climate. The town of Waiouru, with its army camp, lies to the south and much of the southern part of the desert is used for training purposes. To the north of the desert lies the Rangipo prison farm.

Many of the North Island's largest rivers have their headwaters in the area, particularly around the slopes of Mount Ruapehu, the North Island's highest mountain. These include the Waikato and Whangaehu Rivers, as well as major tributaries of the Rangitikei and Whanganui Rivers.

The desert is bisected by only one sealed road, a section of State Highway 1 known as the Desert Road. The road is closed for short periods most winters with barriers arms due to severe snow storms and icy road conditions. Turangi emergency services monitor the northern part of the Desert Road and the NZDF Military Police at Waiouru is responsible for the southern end.  The boundary between the Waikato and Manawatū-Whanganui regions intersects the Desert Road at its summit, which at 1074m above sea level is the highest pass on the New Zealand State Highway network.

The Lord of the Rings films were shot in New Zealand, and the Black Gate of Mordor scenes were shot in the Rangipo Desert in 2000.

References

External links
 The Round the Mountain Track, Tongariro National Park
New Zealand Small Town travel guide - Waiouru

Deserts of New Zealand
Ruapehu District
Volcanic deserts